The 1968 Ohio Bobcats football team was an American football team that represented Ohio University during the 1968 NCAA University Division football season. In their 11th season under head coach Bill Hess, the Bobcats won the Mid-American Conference (MAC) championship, compiled a 10–1 record (6–0 against MAC opponents), and outscored all opponents by a combined total of 418 to 228.  The team was undefeated in the regular season but lost to Richmond in the 1968 Tangerine Bowl.  They played their home games in Peden Stadium in Athens, Ohio.

The team's statistical leaders included quarterback Cleve Bryant with 1,524 passing yards and 734 rushing yards, Dave LeVeck with 850 rushing yards, and Todd Snyder with 777 receiving yards.

Schedule

References

Ohio
Ohio Bobcats football seasons
Mid-American Conference football champion seasons
Ohio Bobcats football